Herbrechtingen is a town in the district of Heidenheim in Baden-Württemberg in southern Germany. It is situated on the river Brenz, 7 km south of Heidenheim, and 28 km northeast of Ulm.

Twin towns – sister cities
Herbrechtingen is twinned with:

  Mošnov, Czech Republic (1977)
  Karavukovo, Serbia (1984)
  Horná Štubňa, Slovakia (1986)  
  Biatorbágy, Hungary (1989)

References

Heidenheim (district)
Württemberg